Väike-Kamari is a settlement in Põltsamaa Parish, Jõgeva County in central Estonia.

References

External links 
Satellite map at Maplandia.com

Villages in Jõgeva County